Alex Bain-Stewart (born October 1944) is a councilman of the City of London Corporation where he represents the ward of Farringdon Within. He has an MSc in Engineering from the University of Hertfordshire and is a Justice of the Peace. He is a member of The Worshipful Company of Gold and Silver Wyre Drawers.

References 

Living people
1944 births
Councilmen and Aldermen of the City of London
Sheriffs of the City of London
Alumni of the University of Hertfordshire
Engineers from London
English justices of the peace